Kuklica is a small village  in the municipality of Kratovo, North Macedonia. It is known for the hundreds of naturally formed stone pillars that resemble humans. The village has about 100 inhabitants.

Geographic location
It is known by natural phenomena of characteristic erosive landforms called earth pyramids, earth pillars or stone dolls.

Demographics
According to the 2002 census, the village had a total of 97 inhabitants. Ethnic groups in the village include:

Macedonians 97

See also
Stone town of Kuklica

References

Villages in Kratovo Municipality